Kim Sang-bum (born July 7, 1989), known professionally as Kim Bum (alternatively Kim Beom), is a South Korean actor, dancer, singer and model. He is best known for his television roles as F4 member So Yi-jung in Boys Over Flowers (2009), guardian angel Lee Gook-soo in Padam Padam (2011), villainous CEO Lee Ro-joon in Mrs. Cop 2 (2016),  half-blood gumiho Lee Rang in Tale of the Nine Tailed (2020), and Han Joon Hwi in Law School (2021). His latest drama in 2022 is Ghost Doctor which he played as Koh Seung-tak, 1st year cardiothoracic surgeon.

Early life and education
Kim Sang-beom was born in Seoul, South Korea on July 7, 1989. He attended Chung-ang University, majoring in Film and Theater.

Career

2006–2007: Beginnings
Kim joined the "Survival Star Audition", and was placed 6th out of hundreds of contestants. However, because he was under 20, he could not proceed in the competition. "Survival Star Audition" opened many opportunities for Kim, and he received multiple roles in television series. Kim made his acting debut in the sitcom High Kick!.

2008–2011: Rising popularity
Kim first gained recognition for his scene-stealing role in MBC's anniversary drama East of Eden, winning the Netizen Popularity Award at the Korea Drama Awards. He rose to prominence in 2009 after playing the role of So Yi-jung in the hit drama Boys Over Flowers. He achieved further recognition with his supporting role in fantasy melodrama Padam Padam (2011), written by Noh Hee-kyung.

2012–2015: Solo debut and overseas activities
Kim released his first studio album, Hometown, on June 20, 2012. He performed his first solo concert, Kim Beom Japan Live 2012, at the Stellar Ball in Tokyo's Shinagawa Prince Hotel.

In 2013, Kim reunited with Noh in romance melodrama That Winter, The Wind Blows (2013). He made his Chinese film debut in Young Detective Dee: Rise of the Sea Dragon directed by Tsui Hark, which became one of the highest grossing Chinese films of the year. He then starred in the thriller Miracle Hands by Kwon Ho-young. The same year, he took on his first historical drama Goddess of Fire which co-stars Moon Geun-young.

In 2014, Kim was cast in his first Chinese television drama V Love, also known as the Chinese version of Gossip Girls. Kim subsequently starred in two Chinese films; romantic comedy Lovers & Movies and suspense film The Beloved.

2015–present: Comeback to Korea
Kim made his small-screen comeback in tvN's crime thriller Hidden Identity in 2015. He starred in another crime thriller Mrs. Cop 2, and earned praise for his portrayal of a villain.

In 2018, Kim appeared in Detective K: Secret of the Living Dead, the third installment in the comedy-mystery Detective K film series, marking his return to Korean cinemas after four years.

He enlisted in the military in April 2018 and was released in March 2020.

In 2020, he starred in the fantasy drama Tale of the Nine Tailed alongside Lee Dong-wook and Jo Bo-ah.

In 2021, he starred in legal drama Law School.

In 2022, Kim starred in Ghost Doctor, acting alongside Rain. Later July, Kim joined the UNIVERSE communication platform.

Personal life
In February 2012, Kim's agency announced that he was suffering from degenerative arthritis due to the dramatic weight-loss he experienced after training for his role in the JTBC cable drama Padam Padam.

Kim is close friends with fellow actors Lee Min-ho and Jung Il-woo.

Relationship 
It was revealed on November 1, 2013, that Kim was dating his Goddess of Fire co-star, Moon Geun-young. On May 15, 2014, media outlets reported that they had ended their 7-month-long relationship. Agencies of both actors confirmed the news stating: "They did break up not too long ago but have decided to remain good friends and supportive colleagues".

On March 29, 2018, it was confirmed that Kim is in a relationship with actress Oh Yeon-seo. However, after a few months of dating they were reported to have parted ways.

Filmography

Film

Television series

Discography

Albums

Awards and nominations

Listicles

References

External links
  

1989 births
Chung-Ang University alumni
King Kong by Starship artists
Kyungbock High School alumni
Living people
People from Seoul
Male actors from Seoul
Models from Seoul
Singers from Seoul
South Korean male film actors
South Korean pop singers
South Korean male television actors
21st-century South Korean singers